In political theory and theology, to immanentize the eschaton is a generally pejorative term referring to attempts to bring about utopian conditions in the world, and to effectively create heaven on earth. Theologically, the belief is akin to postmillennialism as reflected in the Social Gospel of the 1880–1930 era, as well as Protestant reform movements during the Second Great Awakening in the 1830s and 1840s such as abolitionism.

Origin
Modern usage of the phrase started with Eric Voegelin in The New Science of Politics in 1952. Conservative spokesman William F. Buckley popularized Voegelin's phrase as "Don't immanentize the eschaton!" Buckley's version became a political slogan of Young Americans for Freedom during the 1960s and 1970s.

Voegelin identified a number of similarities between ancient Gnosticism and the beliefs held by a number of modern political theories, particularly Communism and Nazism. He identified the root of the Gnostic impulse as belief in a lack of concord within society as a result of an inherent disorder, or even evil, of the world. He described this as having two effects:
The belief that the disorder of the world can be transcended by extraordinary insight, learning, or knowledge, called a Gnostic Speculation by Voegelin (the Gnostics themselves referred to this as gnosis).
The desire to implement a policy to actualize the speculation, or as Voegelin said, to Immanentize the Eschaton, to create a sort of heaven on earth within history. See Scientism.

One of the more oft-quoted passages from Voegelin's work on Gnosticism is that "The problem of an eidos in history, hence, arises only when a Christian transcendental fulfillment becomes immanentized. Such an immanentist hypostasis of the eschaton, however, is a theoretical fallacy."

James H. Billington's 1980 book, Fire in the Minds of Men, explores the idea further.

Christianity

The Lutheran Confessions directly reject the idea of an immanentized eschaton, condemning the belief "that before the resurrection of the dead the godly shall take possession of the kingdom of the world, the ungodly being everywhere suppressed."

The Catechism of the Catholic Church makes an oblique reference to the desire to "Immanentize the Eschaton" in article 676:
The Antichrist's deception already begins to take shape in the world every time the claim is made to realize within history that messianic hope which can only be realized beyond history through the eschatological judgment. The Church has rejected even modified forms of this falsification of the kingdom to come under the name of millenarianism, especially the "intrinsically perverse" political form of a secular messianism.At the end of the 12th century, Joachim of Fiore theorized the coming of an age of earthly bliss right before the end of time. Although not a full immanentization, Joachim has opened the way to an anticipation of the eschaton in the course of time. His ideas have influenced the thoughts on an immanentized eschaton.

Political interpretations
In contemporary terminology this process is sometimes described as "hastening the eschaton" or "hastening the apocalypse.” In this sense it refers to a phenomenon related to millenarianism and the specific Christian form of millennialism which is based on a particular reading of the Christian Bible's Book of Revelation especially popular among evangelicals in the United States.

In popular culture
The phrase is cited in the Discordian text Principia Discordia, first published in 1965, and appears fifteen times in Robert Anton Wilson and Robert Shea's 1975 The Illuminatus! Trilogy, the first line of which reads: "It was the year when they finally immanentized the Eschaton."

In Ken Macleod's 1997 science fiction novel The Stone Canal, one of the chapters is called, "Another crack at Immanentising the Eschaton."

The phrase is also used in issue four of Warren Ellis and Ivan Rodriguez's 2007 comic, Doktor Sleepless. It appears to be the goal of the title character to bring about the end of the world, driven by disappointment over how the future of the past has transpired. Sleepless wants to end the world to keep it from getting worse. The phrase is quoted several times, and can be regarded as the driving force behind the comic.

Frederik Pohl wrote a trilogy of books from 1997 to 1999 known as The Eschaton Sequence.  In these books, the human race is caught up in a galactic war fought between two alien races attempting to immanentize the eschaton.  The books are titled The Other End of Time, The Siege of Eternity and The Far Shore of Time.

It is quoted (on a banner) in  Larry Niven and Jerry Pournelle's 2009 novel Escape from Hell.

It was used in the lyrics of the two rave singles "All You Need Is Love" by The Justified Ancients of Mu Mu in 1987, and the Shamen's "Destination Eschaton" in 1995.

In Mike Baron’s Nexus novel (2020), Horatio philosophizes about the human condition, and expands with, “We must immanentize the eschaton ex post haste de facto.”

See also
Accelerationism
Apocalypticism
Postmillennialism
Premillennialism

Potentiality and actuality

References

External links
Why Ecocide Is 'Good News' for the GOP —Alternet (May 4, 2003)

Eschatology
Premillennialism
Discordianism
Political slurs